Slovakia competed at the 2019 World Aquatics Championships in Gwangju, South Korea from 12 to 28 July.

Artistic swimming

Slovakia's artistic swimming team consisted of 12 athletes (12 female).

Women

 Legend: (R) = Reserve Athlete

Open water swimming

Slovakia qualified one male and one female open water swimmers.

Men

Women

Swimming

Slovakia entered four swimmers.

Men

Women

References

World Aquatics Championships
Nations at the 2019 World Aquatics Championships
2019